13 Ways to Bleed on Stage is the second studio album by American rock band Cold, released on September 12, 2000. With four popular singles, it gained substantial commercial success, achieving gold status, and landed Cold in the mainstream rock scene.

Background and recording
About a year prior to recording 13 Ways, the band enlisted guitarist Terry Balsamo; frontman Scooter Ward, who had sung and played guitar, wanted to focus solely on singing. After trying a few musicians from Los Angeles, Cold chose fellow Jacksonville native Balsamo, who'd played with its members since the age of 18.

The main song structures for 13 Ways were written prior to entering the studio. Using C tuning (the main tuning used in Cold's catalog), the band then experimented with various sounds and dynamics in the studio. Balsamo primarily used an Ibanez RG570 and Mesa Boogie Triple Rectifier.

It is often considered as Cold's darkest record.  The album has a Parental advisory on the cover art for strong language and dark graphic themes such as drug addiction and its consequences, relationship troubles, and social indifference. Guest vocalists include Aaron Lewis of Staind and Sierra Swan who would also appear on the band's next album.

Album art
Cold's second album marked the first appearance of the band's spider logo and corresponding text. Its CD booklet design depicts a tattered old book held shut with rubber bands. The liner notes feature morbid figure illustrations and imagery of X-Acto knives and other cutting utensils.

Touring and promotion
Following the album's release, Cold toured for a year and a half to promote it. They embarked on a three-week tour with 3 Doors Down and a month with Marilyn Manson before joining Limp Bizkit and DMX on the Anger Management Tour for a few weeks. Cold (along with the Offspring, Weezer, Social Distortion, Incubus and Adema) was on the bill for the first annual Inland Invasion, which took place on August 25, 2001 and was hosted by the Los Angeles radio station KROQ.

Singles for the album included "Just Got Wicked", "End of the World", "No One" and "Bleed". All of the said tracks had music videos which saw moderate airplay on MTV2. The majority of singles from 13 Ways also received significant radio play and were instrumental in launching Cold into the mainstream music scene.

"Just Got Wicked" appears on MTV: The Return of the Rock, Vol. 2, ECW: Extreme Music Vol. 2: Anarchy Rocks, and the soundtrack to the video game Jet Grind Radio. "No One" is featured on the soundtrack to the film A Walk to Remember.

Commercial performance 
The album debuted at #174 on the Billboard 200, selling 6,251 copies in its first week. It later peaked at #98, staying on the chart for 27 weeks. Five months after its release, it had sold 81,046 copies according to Nielsen Soundscan.

In February 2002, the album was certified gold by the RIAA for shipments of over 500,000 copies.

As of 2003, the album has sold 467,000 copies in the US.

Track listing

Personnel
Credits adapted from album’s liner notes.

Cold
 Scooter Ward – vocals, piano, keyboards, additional guitars
 Kelly Hayes – lead guitar
 Terry Balsamo – rhythm guitar
 Jeremy Marshall – bass
 Sam McCandless – drums

Additional personnel
 Aaron Lewis – additional vocals on "Send in the Clowns" and "Bleed"
 Sierra Swan – additional vocals on "No One" and "Witch"

Production
 Producers: Cold, Adam Kasper, Chris Vrenna (tracks 1-6, 8, 9, 11), Fred Durst (track 2)
 Engineers: Chris Vrenna (tracks 1-6, 8, 9, 11), Sam Hofstedt (tracks 7, 10, 12, 13)
 Programming: Chris Vrenna
 Mixing: David J. Holman
 Mastering: Louis F. Hemsey
 Executive producer: Jordan Schur
 Production coordination: Les Scurry
 Art direction: Cold
 Creative director: Joe-Mama Nitzberg

Charts

Certifications

Acoustic EP
An acoustic EP was released as a free bonus disc with the purchase of 13 Ways to Bleed on Stage.

Track listing
 "No One (Acoustic)" – 3:16
 "End of the World (Acoustic)" – 3:37
 "Just Got Wicked (Acoustic)" – 3:59

Track 1 & 3
 Mixed by Ross Hogarth at Master Control
 Produced by Cold

Track 2
 Mixed by David J. Holman
 Produced by Cold

Credits
 All Songs Mastered by Louis F. Hemsey
 Executive Producer – Jordan Schur
 All Songs Written by Cold
 Published by Into Everything Music
 2001 Flip/Geffen Records

References

Cold (band) albums
2000 albums
Geffen Records albums
Albums produced by Adam Kasper
Albums produced by Chris Vrenna
Flip Records (1994) albums
Albums produced by Fred Durst